Fritz Lang (1890–1976) was an Austrian film director, producer and screenwriter. In Lang's early career he worked primarily as a screenwriter, finishing film scripts in four to five days. Lang directed major German films of the silent and early sound eras including Metropolis (1927) and M (1931) respectively. After fleeing from the Nazi regime, Lang directed some of the most important American crime and film noir motion pictures of the studio era, such as The Big Heat (1953). Lang appeared as himself in Jean-Luc Godard's Contempt (Le Mepris, 1963).

Filmography

Films

Contributions

Notes
General

 
 
 
 

Specific

External links
 

Lang, Fritz